The 1949 San Francisco Dons football team was an American football team that represented the University of San Francisco as an independent during the 1949 college football season. In their second season under head coach Joe Kuharich, the Dons compiled a 7–3 record and outscored their opponents by a combined total of 260 to 144.

Schedule

References

San Francisco
San Francisco Dons football seasons
San Francisco Dons football